Koi Aane Ko Hai (English: Someone is there to Come) is an Indian supernatural drama television series that premiered on 13 March 2009 on Colors. The series is co-produced by Ekta Kapoor and Shobha Kapoor under their banner Balaji Telefilms.

Plot
The series revolves around the tales of alleged supernatural occurrences in the city that involves around various haunted houses, ghouls and the undead.

Cast

 Raj Singh Arora
 Pooja Gor as Pooja 
Leena Jumani as Suhasi 
Tina Datta as Paromita Roy
Jaya Bhattacharya as Amari Roy
Prerna Wanvari as Neelam & Ratna ( Double Role )
Vinod Singh as 
Prarthana Behere  as  
Yash Dasgupta  as  Kalketu
 Neetha Shetty
 Rashmi Desai as Shivani, episode: Charitra
 Chaitanya Choudhry as Rahul,  episode: Charitra
Geetanjali Mishra as Meera, episode: Charitra
Rohit Bakshi as Vanraj the ghost/ Meera's husband, episode: Charitra

References

External links
 Official Page on BalajiTelefilms.com

Balaji Telefilms television series
2009 Indian television series debuts
Colors TV original programming
Indian anthology television series
Indian horror fiction television series
Indian supernatural television series
Paranormal reality television series
2010s Indian television series
Hindi-language television shows